The 2003 Chinese Football Super Cup (Chinese: 2003中国足球超霸杯) was the 9th Chinese Football Super Cup, an annual football match contested by the winners of the previous season's Super League and FA Cup competitions. The match was played at the Wuhu Olympic Park Stadium on 18 January 2004, and contested by league champions Shanghai Shenhua and cup winners Beijing Hyundai. Beijing Hyundai won the title 4–3.

Match details

See also 
Chinese Jia-A League 2003
2003 Chinese FA Cup

References 

2003 in Chinese football
2003